Elizabeth Ann Sackler (born February 19, 1948) is a public historian, arts activist, and the daughter of Arthur M. Sackler. She is the founder of the American Indian Ritual Object Repatriation Foundation and the Elizabeth A. Sackler Center for Feminist Art at the Brooklyn Museum.

Early life and education 
In 1966, Sackler graduated from New Lincoln School, an experimental private high school in New York City, where she became in involved in activism. In 1997, Sackler received her PhD with a concentration in public history from Union Institute & University.

Career

Early work 
In 1992, Sackler became frustrated with Sotheby's refusal to repatriate Native American ceremonial masks, so she purchased them and returned them to their tribes of origin. This led her to become interested in art and social justice issues for American Indians, which led her to become the founding president of the American Indian Ritual Object Repatriation Foundation. She is also President of The Arthur M. Sackler Foundation and the Elizabeth A. Sackler Foundation.

Brooklyn Museum 
In 2007, she founded the Elizabeth A. Sackler Center for Feminist Art, the first museum center devoted to female artists and feminist art, located at the Brooklyn Museum. A centerpiece of the center's collection is Judy Chicago's installation of her work, The Dinner Party, which is located at the Brooklyn Museum. Sackler and Chicago had been friends since the 1970s.

In June 2014, Sackler became the first woman to be elected Chairman by the Brooklyn Museum Board of Trustees, a position she held until June 2016. She has served as a member of the Board of Trustees of the Brooklyn Museum since 2000. More recently, Sackler's work has focused on issues related to women in prison, including the program series States of Denial: The Illegal Incarceration of Women, Children, and People of Color as well as the exhibition Women of York: Shared Dining, both at the Brooklyn Museum's Elizabeth A. Sackler Center for Feminist Art.

Family 
Sackler was born in New York City to Arthur M. Sackler, psychiatrist, entrepreneur and philanthropist and Else Jorgensen, from Denmark. Sackler is a mother of two children.

Controversy 
In October 2017, Esquire and The New Yorker published critical articles outlining connections among Purdue Pharma, the larger Sackler family and Oxycontin's role in the opioid crisis.  In response, Elizabeth Sackler claimed that neither she, nor her children, “benefited in any way” from the sale of Oxycontin or ever held shares in Purdue Pharma.  Articles confirmed that her father's option in a different pharmaceutical company, Purdue Frederick, were sold shortly after his death in 1987, to Purdue Pharma owners Mortimer and Raymond Sackler, years before the advent of Oxycontin.  Online outlet Hyperallergic reviewed legal documents confirming her statement  and later articles in the New York Times, Associated Press, and other outlets published clarifications and corrections all confirming her branch of the family's separation from Purdue Pharma and all Oxycontin profits.  Elizabeth Sackler said she admired Nan Goldin and all activists seeking to hold Purdue accountable for "morally abhorrent" behavior.

In response, Goldin noted that Elizabeth's father, Arthur, earned his fortune in significant part through marketing of tranquilizers, including Valium, that were widely abused.

"We have heard repeatedly from Arthur’s widow, Dame Jillian Sackler, and Elizabeth that because Arthur died before the existence of Oxycontin, they didn’t benefit from it. But he was the architect of the advertising model used so effectively to push the drug. He also turned Valium into the first million-dollar drug," Goldin said in 2018. "The whole Sackler clan is evil," she added.

Goldin's claims regarding the connection between Arthur Sackler's legacy and the opioid crisis in the United States have been echoed by some researchers and academics. Former New York Times journalist Barry Meier wrote in his book Pain Killer that Arthur Sackler "helped pioneer some of the most controversial and troubling practices in medicine: the showering of favors on doctors, the lavish spending on consultants and experts ready to back a drugmaker’s claims, the funding of supposedly independent commercial interest groups, the creation of publications to serve as industry mouthpieces, and the outright exploitation of scientific research for marketing purposes." Psychiatrist Allen Frances told The New Yorker in 2017 that “[m]ost of the questionable practices that propelled the pharmaceutical industry into the scourge it is today can be attributed to Arthur Sackler.”

Honors and awards 
 1994: Native American Film and Video Celebration, Lincoln Center (New York, NY), Honorary Award, Executive Producer Life Spirit
 1998: The Union Institute (Cincinnati, OH), Sussman Award for Academic Excellence
 1999: Yurok Tribal Council (Eureka, CA), Honor
 2002: Brooklyn Museum (Brooklyn, NY), Community Committee's Women in the Arts Award
 2003: Women’s eNews (New York, NY), 21 Leaders of the 21st Century Award
 2004: Women’s Caucus for Art (Seattle, WA), President’s Award
 2005: Drums Along The Hudson (New York, NY), Native American of the Year
 2006: ArtTable Award, Distinguished Service to the Visual Arts
 2007: Moore College of Art, Visionary Woman Award.
 2015: Studio Arts College International (SACI), Honorary MFA degree

Memberships and leadership 
 National Council on Public History, Member
 Metropolitan Museum of Art, Fellow for Life
 Institute of American Indian Arts Museum (Santa Fe, NM), Founder’s Circle
 1987–present: The Arthur M. Sackler Foundation (New York, NY), CEO
 1992–present: American Indian Ritual Object Repatriation Foundation (New York, NY), Founder and President
 1995–1999: Smithsonian Institution (Washington, D.C.), Founding President, Friends of the Freer and Sackler Galleries
 2000–present: National Museum of Women in the Arts (Washington, D.C.), National Advisory Board
 2000–2018: Brooklyn Museum (Brooklyn, NY), Board of Trustees, Collections Committee, Executive Committee
 2014–2016: Chairman, Board of Trustees.
 2001–present: Elizabeth A. Sackler Foundation (New York, NY), President
 2001–2006: New Mexico Statuary Hall Foundation, Office of Indian Affairs (Santa Fe, NM), Board Member for the National Statuary Hall Collection, Washington, D.C.

See also
 Sackler family
!Women Art Revolution - Sackler, among others, was interviewed for this film.

Works and publications

References

External links 

 
 
 Elizabeth Sackler at Brooklyn Museum
 Elizabeth Sackler at American Indian Ritual Object Repatriation Foundation
 Elizabeth A. Sackler papers at the Sophia Smith Collection, Smith College Special Collections

1948 births
Living people
Activists from New York City
Writers from New York City
Union Institute & University alumni
Philanthropists from New York (state)
American feminists
American people of Danish descent
American people of Polish-Jewish descent
Jewish American philanthropists
Sackler family